Mullah Neda Mohammad Nadeem (مولوي ندا محمد ندیم) is an Afghan politician, member of the Taliban and current Minister of Higher Education since October 2022. Previously, he held a position as Police Chief of the Nangarhar province since September 2021. Neda Mohammad also served as Governor of Nangarhar province from August 2021 to 20 September 2021 and was replaced by Daud Muzamil.

References

Year of birth missing (living people)
Living people
Taliban governors
Governors of Nangarhar Province
Place of birth missing (living people)
Afghan police officers